National Highway 143A, commonly called NH 143A is a national highway in  India. It is a spur road of National Highway 43. NH-143A traverses the state of Jharkhand in India.

Route 
Gumla, Ghaghra, Lohardaga, Kuru

Junctions  

Terminal with National Highway 43 near Gumla.

Terminal with National Highway 39 near Kuru.

See also 
List of National Highways in India by highway number

References

External links 

 NH 143A on OpenStreetMap

National highways in India
National Highways in Jharkhand